Alexandre Mendy (born 20 March 1994) is a professional footballer who plays as a forward for Ligue 2 club Caen. Born in France, he plays for the Guinea-Bissau national team.

Club career
A youth product of Nice, Mendy was loaned six months in 2014 to semi-professional club Strasbourg to gain more playing time. He was again loaned eight months later to Ligue 2 side Nîmes, where he made his full professional in September 2014, in a 2–0 Ligue 2 defeat against Gazélec Ajaccio.

On 21 June 2016, Mendy signed for Ligue 1 side Guingamp. The transfer fee was estimated at between €600,000 and 1 million.

In June 2017, Mendy moved to league rivals Bordeaux, signing a four-year deal.

International career
Mendy is of Senegalese and Bissau-Guinean descent. He was called up to represent the Guinea-Bissau national team in October 2020. Mendy debuted for Guinea-Bissau in a 1-0 Africa Cup of Nations qualification loss to Senegal on 15 November 2020.

Personal life
Mendy is the cousin of fellow footballers Nampalys Mendy and Bafétimbi Gomis.

Career statistics

Club

References

External links
 
 
 Alexandre Mendy foot-national.com Profile
 National Football Teams profile

1994 births
Living people
Sportspeople from Toulon
Citizens of Guinea-Bissau through descent
Association football forwards
Bissau-Guinean footballers
Guinea-Bissau international footballers
French footballers
Bissau-Guinean people of Senegalese descent
French people of Bissau-Guinean descent
French sportspeople of Senegalese descent
Ligue 1 players
Ligue 2 players
Championnat National players
OGC Nice players
RC Strasbourg Alsace players
Nîmes Olympique players
En Avant Guingamp players
FC Girondins de Bordeaux players
Stade Brestois 29 players
Stade Malherbe Caen players
Footballers from Provence-Alpes-Côte d'Azur